Alfred Kunze, Továrna na stroje a osobní automobily was a  Czech manufacturer of automobiles.

History 
The company was founded in Růžodol near Liberec as a machine factory, repair shop and motor vehicle maker. In 1925, the production of automobiles began. The brand name was called AKA. Production ended in that same year.

Vehicles 
The company manufactured some passenger cars and trucks.

Literature 
 Harald H. Linz, Halwart Schrader: Die Internationale Automobil-Enzyklopädie. United Soft Media Verlag, Munich 2008, ISBN 978-3-8032-9876-8. (German)
 Marián Šuman-Hreblay: Encyklopedie automobilů. České a slovenské osobní automobily od roku 1815 do současnosti. Computer Press, Brünn 2007, ISBN 978-80-251-1587-9. (Czech)

References 

Motor vehicle manufacturers of Czechoslovakia
Defunct motor vehicle manufacturers of Czechoslovakia
Vehicle manufacturing companies established in 1925
Vehicle manufacturing companies disestablished in 1925
1925 establishments in Czechoslovakia